The 1988 Miami Hurricanes baseball team represented the University of Miami in the 1988 NCAA Division I baseball season. The Hurricanes played their home games at Mark Light Field. The team was coached by Ron Fraser in his 26th season at Miami.

The Hurricanes reached the College World Series, where they finished tied for fifth after recording a win against Fresno State and losses to eventual semifinalist  and champion Stanford.

Personnel

Roster

Coaches

Schedule and results

References

Miami Hurricanes baseball seasons
Miami Hurricanes
College World Series seasons
Miami Hurricanes baseball
Miam